Graphorn is a genus of shield bug found in Argentina. As of 2022, it is monospecific, just consisting of G. bicallosus (a senior synonym of the type species G. bicornutus). The genus is named after the graphorn, a magical creature from the Harry Potter series. It is found in Argentina,  and Paraguay.

See also
 List of organisms named after the Harry Potter series

References

Arthropods of Argentina
Invertebrates of Paraguay
Monotypic Hemiptera genera
Pentatomidae